Lucrezia Gennaro (born 25 July 2001) is an Italian figure skater. She is the 2018 Triglav Trophy champion, the 2018 EduSport Trophy champion, the 2018 Denkova-Staviski Cup silver medalist, the 2019 Sofia Trophy silver medalist, and the 2019 Open Ice Mall Cup silver medalist. She has competed in the final segment at two ISU Championships – the 2016 World Junior Championships and 2019 European Championships.

Career

Early career 
Gennaro began learning to skate in 2004. She competed in the advanced novice ranks during the 2013–2014 and 2014–2015 seasons. In February 2015, she became the Italian national junior champion.

2015–2016 season 
Coached by Ludmila Mladenova in Padova, Gennaro made her junior international debut in August 2015, placing seventh at the ISU Junior Grand Prix (JGP) in Bratislava, Slovakia. In December, she won her second junior national title. In February, she represented Italy at the 2016 Winter Youth Olympics in Hamar, Norway. She placed 9th in the individual ladies' event and her team finished seventh. At the 2016 World Junior Championships, held in March in Debrecen, Hungary, she qualified to the free skate and finished 19th overall (23rd in the short program, 17th in the free skate).

2016–2017 season 
Making her senior national debut, Gennaro placed fifth at the Italian Championships in December 2016. In February, she won the bronze medal at the 2017 European Youth Olympic Winter Festival in Erzurum, Turkey.

2017–2018 season 
Gennaro made her senior international debut in early November, at the 2017 Denkova-Staviski Cup, having become age-eligible at the beginning of the season. Although also eligible for junior events, she made no appearances on the junior level. She won three senior international medals – gold in January at the EduSport Trophy in Otopeni, Romania; bronze in March at the Sarajevo Open in Sarajevo, Bosnia and Herzegovina; and gold in April at the Triglav Trophy in Jesenice, Slovenia.

2018–2019 season 
Competing in the senior ranks, Gennaro won silver at the Denkova-Staviski Cup in November and placed 5th at the Italian Championships in December. In January, she represented Italy at the 2019 European Championships in Minsk, Belarus; she placed 16th in the short program and qualified to the final segment.

Programs

Competitive highlights 
JGP: Junior Grand Prix

Detailed results 
Small medals for short and free programs awarded only at ISU Championships.

Senior results

Junior results

References

External links 
 

2001 births
Italian female single skaters
Living people
Sportspeople from Treviso
Figure skaters at the 2016 Winter Youth Olympics
21st-century Italian women